The Manitoba Bisons are an ice hockey team that represents the University of Manitoba. They compete in the Canada West Universities Athletic Association in the Canadian Interuniversity Sport athletic program. Home games are contested at the Wayne Fleming Arena (located at 109 Sidney Smith St) in Winnipeg, Manitoba.

History
On March 22, 2009, the Bisons challenged the Moncton Aigles Bleues women's ice hockey program in the bronze medal game of the 2009 CIS national women's ice hockey championship. Marieve Provost of Moncton scored the game-winner in a shootout with a 3-2 victory over Manitoba, as Moncton captured the Atlantic conference's first-ever medal at the CIS women's hockey championship.

In 2018, the program would win its first-ever national championship. Contested on March 18, the Bisons blanked the Western Mustangs women's ice hockey program in a 2-0 shutout victory.

Year by year

USports Tournament results
In Progress

Awards and honours
 Jon Rempel: 2017-18 Bison Sports Coach of the Year

University Awards
2017-18 BISON SPORTS ROOKIE OF THE YEAR - Female: Lauren Taraschuk
2017-18 BISON SPORTS STUDENT-ATHLETE LEADERSHIP & COMMUNITY DEVELOPMENT AWARD Female: Alana Serhan

Bisons Athlete of the Year
Stacey Corfield, Manitoba Bisons Female Athlete of the Year (2008–09)
Addie Miles, Manitoba Bisons Female Athlete of the Year (2011–12)
Lauryn Keen, Manitoba Bisons Female Athlete of the Year (2016–17)
Venla Hovi, Manitoba Bisons Female Athlete of the Year (2017–18)

CIS awards

USports awards
Venla Hovi, Player of the Game, Gold Medal Game, 2018 U SPORTS Women’s Hockey Championship
Lauryn Keen, 2018 U SPORTS Women’s Hockey Championship Tournament Most Valuable Player
Caitlin Fyten, 2018 U SPORTS Women’s Hockey Championship Tournament All-Star Team
Lauryn Keen, 2018 U SPORTS Women’s Hockey Championship Tournament All-Star Team
Alanna Sharman, 2018 U SPORTS Women’s Hockey Championship Tournament All-Star Team

USports All-Canadians
Caitlin MacDonald, 2012-13 USports Second Team All-Star

Canada West awards
 Lauryn Keen: Canada West Female First Star of the Week (the week ending March 18, 2018)

Canada West All-Star selections

First Team

Second Team

Canada West All-Rookie Team

Team MVP

International
Caitlin MacDonald, 2010 IIHF World Women's U18 Championship (Gold Medal)
Venla Hovi, Ice hockey at the 2018 Winter Olympics – Women's tournament

Winter Universiade
Stacey Corfield, 2009 Winter Universiade 
Addie Miles, 2011 Winter Universiade, Gold Medal
Maggie Litchfield-Medd - Manitoba : 2015 Winter Universiade
Erica Rieder, Defence, : 2017 Winter Universiade
Alanna Sharman, Forward, : 2017 Winter Universiade

References

Ice Hockey, Women's
Ice hockey teams in Winnipeg
U Sports women's ice hockey teams
Women's ice hockey teams in Canada
Manitoba Bisons women's ice hockey